The Women's 25 km competition at the 2017 World Championships was held on 21 July 2017.

Results
The race was started at 08:45.

References

Women's 25 km
World